The Order of the Partisan Star was an honorary award given to officers and military units in the People's Socialist Republic of Albania.

Definition
The order was given to active and reservist officers of the People's Army, the Ministry of Internal Affairs, the Volunteer Forces of the People's Self-Defence, military units, and subdivisions for military service in time of war.

The "Partisan Star" order had three classes: I, II, III.

See also
Orders, decorations and medals of Albania

References

Awards established in 1945
Order